3-Chlorophenmetrazine (3-CPM, PAL-594) is a recreational designer drug with stimulant effects. It is a substituted phenylmorpholine derivative, closely related to better known drugs such as phenmetrazine and 3-fluorophenmetrazine. It has been shown to act as a monoamine releaser with some preference for dopamine and noradrenaline release over serotonin.

See also 
 3-Bromomethylphenidate
 3-Chloromethamphetamine
 3-Chloromethcathinone
 4-Methylphenmetrazine
 G-130
 Methylenedioxyphenmetrazine
 Phendimetrazine
 PDM-35
 Radafaxine

References 

Substituted amphetamines
Phenylmorpholines
Designer drugs